Postolar Tripper was a hip hop-ethno-ska-reggae band from Zadar, Croatia.
It consists of band members:

 Davor Valčić - vocal  
 Darko Predragović-Dabi – vocal 
 Renato Babić – guitar  
 Pave Ruić – bass guitar  
 Ivan Bačinić-Bačko – percussion  
 Dinko Habuš – trumpet  
 Goran Šućurović–Macko – drums  
 Zvonko Ćoso - Management
 
They first appeared on the music scene by posting their song "Aaaaaaaaa.!?" on the 057 radio station from Zadar in 2002. The song "Tužna priča o selu" followed, confirming the band's hip-hop/ethno style (speaking in the rural dialect of Dalmatia's Ravni kotari better known as "Zaleđe"). This song was No. 1 in the charts of HTV's teen show Briljanteen for months in 2005.

Their third single was "Balada o Viliju i Vesni", for which a video was made by video artist Mara Milin, after which their debut album was released. 
Humour and eccentric usage of the rural elements in their music was also a characteristic of their fourth single, "Čuvaj se sinjske ruke", also used in the film of the same name, by Bore Lee.

A duet in the beginning, Postolar Tripper became a band of eight musicians. Their album Popravni was released in 2008, with single "Na rubu ponora" recorded in ska/reggae style.

Postolar Tripper disbanded in 2017.

Discography 

Sve što iman san ukra (2005, Menart Records)

 "Intro... uzavrela atmosfera - skit"
 "Vuci, vile i balave sopile"
 "Metuzalemska"
 "Drukanje - skit"
 "Sve što iman san ukra"
 "Superdeka"
 "Brackanova žienska"
 "Diskografija i - skit"
 "Ljubio se bijeli golub" feat. Lidija Bajuk
 "Uvod u baladu - skit"
 "Balada o viliju i vesni"
 "Patlidžani & češnjaci (štorija Dubravka Mataković)"
 "Prijatelj iz bosanskog grahova"
 "Čuvaj se sinjske ruke"
 "Tužna priča o selu"
 "Debela"

Zamisli Zivot u Ritmu Cipela za Ples (2007)

 "Brackanova žienska"
 "Fa - Fa"
 "Natasa"
 "Ena"
 "Obicna Ljubavna Pjesma" feat. Shot
 "Andjeli nas zovu da im skinemo krila"
 "Zamisli Zivot u Ritmu Muzike za Ples"
 "Jamo Rasta"
 "Mali Motorin"
 "Sretno Dijete"

Popravni (2008, Menart Records)

 "Ona Za Ribara Neće"
 "Brate brate gospođo"
 "Gradelada"
 "Kolcem priko škine - skit "
 "Marijana"
 "Palma U Pitaru"
 "Pobro"
 "Na Rubu Ponora"
 "Pejstejšn dva - skit"
 "Disko Taliban"
 "Soren I Sam"
 "Čudo"

Čujem ja netko šuti (2012)

 "Kruva bez motike"
 "Burza rada"
 "Zorane, vrati se kući"
 "Moga konja"
 "Loše društvo i labilan karakter"
 "Tabletoman"
 "Problem, reakcija, rješenje"
 "Ska, ska, ska!"
 "Trieste"
 "Gaeta (feat. Libar)"
 "Na kolodvoru"
 "Largo"
 "Uno, due, tre..."
 "Redar Zeljko (feat. Zebrax) - bonus track"

References

External links 
 

Croatian hip hop groups